Frederick Guthrie Tait (11 January 1870 – 7 February 1900) was an amateur golfer and Scottish soldier. 
He won the Amateur Championship twice, in 1896 and again in 1898, by convincing margins. Over his short golf career, Tait recorded at least 28 tournament victories. He tied for third place in the Open Championship in both 1896 and 1897.

Early life

Born at 17 Drummond Place in the Second New Town in Edinburgh, Tait was the third son of eminent physicist and fanatical amateur golfer Peter Guthrie Tait.

The young Tait was educated at the Edinburgh Academy and Sedbergh School. He was admitted to the Royal Military College, Sandhurst, at his second attempt, and is credited with introducing golf there. Tait was commissioned a second lieutenant in the 2nd battalion the Leinster Regiment in 1890, and then transferred as a lieutenant to the 2nd battalion, the Black Watch, in 1894.

He learned golf at an early age and was already swinging golf clubs as a 5-year-old child. As an adult, Tait was an extremely powerful and long hitter of the ball. At The Royal and Ancient Golf Club of St Andrews on 11 January 1893, he hit the ball 250 yards, the ball then rolling on frozen ground and coming to rest 341 yards from the tee.

250 yards was the exact driving distance predicted possible through a careful application of backspin by Tait's father in a paper of 1891, significantly further than the 180 yards achieved at that time. Tait won The Amateur Championship twice (1896 and 1898), finished third in The Open Championship twice (1896 and 1897) and was leading amateur in the same competition on three occasions.

Death and legacy

Tait was killed in action at Koodoosberg, South Africa, during the Second Boer War on 7 February 1900 and is buried there.

A memorial plaque to his (and his father's) memory stands on the inner north wall of St Johns Episcopal Church on Princes Street in Edinburgh.

He is also remembered in the adjacent churchyard by a granite Celtic cross on the Tait family plot on the second burial terrace down from Princes Street.

A memorial plaque from Dunalister Veterans Home is now rehoused in the Black Watch Museum in Perth.

Honours
The Freddie Tait Cup is awarded annually to the leading amateur in the South African Open.

Tournament wins (28)

Note: This list may be incomplete.
1893 Royal and Ancient Golf Club Spring Club Gold Medal
1894 Royal and Ancient Golf Club Royal Medal
1894 Hampshire Isle of Wight and Channel Islands Amateur Champion
1895 Royal and Ancient Golf Club Autumn Bombay Medal, Royal and Ancient Golf Club Jubilee Vase, New Luffness Leconfield Medal, New Luffness Silver Quaich, New Luffness Hope Medal
1896 The Amateur Championship, St. George's Challenge Cup, Royal and Ancient Golf Club Silver Cross Medal, Royal and Ancient Golf Club Royal Medal, Royal and Ancient Golf Club Glennie Aggregate Medal, Royal and Ancient Golf Club Calcutta Cup
1897 Royal and Ancient Golf Club Silver Cross Medal, Royal and Ancient Golf Club Spring Club Gold Medal, Royal and Ancient Golf Club Glennie Aggregate Medal, New Luffness Leconfield Medal
1898 The Amateur Championship, St. George's Challenge Cup, Royal and Ancient Golf Club Spring Club Gold Medal, New Luffness Hope Medal, New Luffness East Lothian County Cup
1899 St. George's Challenge Cup, Royal and Ancient Golf Club Silver Cross Medal, Royal and Ancient Golf Club Calcutta Cup, Royal and Ancient Golf Club Royal Medal, Royal and Ancient Golf Club Glennie Aggregate Medal

Major championships

Amateur wins (2)

Results timeline

Note: Tait played in only The Open Championship and The Amateur Championship.

LA = Low amateur
DNP = Did not play
"T" indicates a tie for a place
R32, R16, QF, SF = Round in which player lost in match play
Green background for wins. Yellow background for top-10

Sources: Open Championship, Amateur Championship: 1892, 1893, 1894, 1895, 1897

Bibliography
 selections reprinted in

References

External links

Archives catalogue for Frederick Guthrie Tait Collection, The Black Watch Castle & Museum, Perth, Scotland

Scottish male golfers
Amateur golfers
British Army personnel of the Second Boer War
British military personnel killed in the Second Boer War
Prince of Wales's Leinster Regiment officers
Black Watch officers
Graduates of the Royal Military College, Sandhurst
People educated at Edinburgh Academy
People educated at Sedbergh School
Golfers from Edinburgh
Sportspeople from Yorkshire
1870 births
1900 deaths